The Ruby Suns are an indie pop group from New Zealand. They formed in 2004 when Californian Ryan McPhun moved to Auckland and started playing in several bands such as The Brunettes, The Tokey Tones, and The Reduction Agents.

Biography
The Ruby Suns are signed to Lil' Chief Records in New Zealand and Memphis Industries in Britain. In early 2007, the band embarked on their first European tour in support of their self-titled debut album, and in addition to that they did a Take-Away Show video session shot by Vincent Moon. In the latter half of 2007, the band toured with The Shins extensively throughout Australia.

In 2007, The Ruby Suns signed to American record label Sub Pop for the US and Asia. The band released their second album, Sea Lion, in January 2008. Later that year, the band recorded the song "Don't Touch the Dusty Fruit" to the Survival International charity album, Songs for Survival, and the song "Oh, Mojave" was used in the Windows Vista commercial for the Mojave Experiment.

In August 2008, The Ruby Suns contributed their track "There Are Birds" to an indie compilation album   Indiecater Vol. 2.

The Ruby Suns' third album is titled Fight Softly and was released on 2 March 2010.

The band's fourth album Christopher was released on 29 January 2013. The track "In Real Life" was featured on the updated soundtrack to Rockstar Games' re-released Grand Theft Auto V, and can be heard on the in-game radio station Radio Mirror Park.

McPhun had moved to Oslo, Norway by the time he recorded the band's fifth album, Sprite Fountain, which was released on 9 June 2017.

Discography

Albums
 The Ruby Suns (2005) Lil' Chief Records
 Sea Lion (2008) Lil' Chief Records
 Fight Softly (2010)
 Christopher (2013)
 Sprite Fountain (2017)

EPs
 XFM Sessions (2007)
 Lichen Ears EP (2007) Lil' Chief Records

References

External links
 The Ruby Suns' page at Lil' Chief Records website
 The Ruby Suns on Sub Pop

New Zealand indie pop groups
Lil' Chief Records artists
Sub Pop artists
Memphis Industries artists